William Lawrence Utley (July 10, 1814March 4, 1887) was an American portrait artist, hotel keeper, politician, newspaper editor, and Union Army Colonel from Racine, Wisconsin. He served in the Wisconsin State Assembly as a Free Soiler, and in the Wisconsin State Senate as a Republican. In later years, he was a nominee of the Greenback Party for Congress and for Governor of Wisconsin.

Early life

Utley was born in Monson, Massachusetts, to Hamilton and Polly Utley. At age four, his father moved the family to Newbury Center, Ohio, about twenty miles east of Cleveland.  He was educated by his father then moved to New York to further his studies as a portrait painter.  Utley was also an amateur violinist and played music for his uncle's dance classes while in New York.

Early career in Wisconsin

Utley moved to Racine, in the Wisconsin Territory, in 1844. He was employed as a portrait artist in Racine and also taught dancing lessons. He also became proprietor of the Racine House—the first large hotel in the area.

He became associated with the newly organized Free Soil Party in 1848, along with a large portion of the population of Racine County. In 1850, was elected on the Free Soil ticket to the Wisconsin State Assembly from Racine's 1st district.  He was re-elected in 1851.

In 1852, he was appointed Adjutant General of the Wisconsin Militia by Governor Leonard J. Farwell.  When the Republican Party of Wisconsin became organized in 1854, Utley became a member.

He was elected to a two-year term in the Wisconsin State Senate from the 7th District (Racine County) in 1860, where he served on the Committee for the Militia.

Civil War service

After the outbreak of the American Civil War, in 1861, Utley was again appointed Adjutant General of the Wisconsin Militia, this time by Governor Alexander Randall.  Utley took the lead in organizing Wisconsin's volunteer regiments for the Union cause.  Over the course of six months, he had helped raise nearly 30,000 soldiers and received a complimentary letter from President Abraham Lincoln for his efforts.

In January 1862, Louis P. Harvey took over as Governor and Utley resumed his work in the Senate.  But before the end of the year, Governor Harvey was dead and Governor Edward Salomon commissioned Utley as a Colonel and ordered him to raise a regiment for service in the Union Army.

Camp Utley was created out of a 75-acre lot between 16th Street and College Avenue in Racine, Wisconsin, and Utley recruited and trained men from Racine, Rock, Green, and Walworth counties.  The 22nd Wisconsin Volunteer Infantry mustered into service September 2, 1862, under Colonel Utley and Lt. Colonel Edward Bloodgood.  On September 22, they marched out with orders to proceed to Cincinnati and join the Army of Kentucky in blunting the Confederate Heartland Offensive.

Fugitive slave incident

The 22nd encountered a number of escaped slaves in Kentucky.  Kentucky was a slave state but still fought on the side of the Union in the Civil War, thus Union forces were ordered to return escaped slaves to their owners.  Utley refused the order and sheltered escaped slaves among his regiment, earning him the nickname the "Abolition Colonel" and the regiment the nickname the "Abolition Regiment".

The case of one particular fugitive, a boy named "Adam", was well documented.  Adam was claimed by Judge George Robertson, who had been Chief Justice of the Kentucky Court of Appeals.  At the insistence of Judge Robertson, Utley was prosecuted in the local courts for theft.  Utley wrote to former Governor Alexander Randall and President Lincoln requesting their assistance in resolving the matter.  On November 26, 1862, President Lincoln wrote to Judge Robertson and offered him compensation up to $500 for the loss of his slave.

At the end of the war, an $800 judgement was rendered against Colonel Utley for having assisted the escape of Adam and other fugitive slaves.  Utley paid the fine, but was later reimbursed by the U.S. government.

Prisoner of war

On March 3, 1863, the 22nd was ordered to Nashville, Tennessee.  They were one of four regiments under the command of Colonel John Coburn ordered to perform reconnaissance toward Columbia, Tennessee, when they encountered a Confederate force near Spring Hill.  Coburn engaged the Confederates in what would become the Battle of Thompson's Station.  The Union forces were surrounded and a large number were captured, including Colonel Utley and Colonel Coburn.  Lt. Colonel Bloodgood escaped the encirclement with about 150 men of the 22nd Wisconsin.

Utley was sent to Libby Prison with most his captured regiment and remained there for two months until they were released in a prisoner exchange.  The 22nd was re-organized at St. Louis and Colonel Utley led them back into the field on June 12, 1863.

Return

Colonel Utley led the regiment for another year in Tennessee, and then into Georgia on the Atlanta campaign under General William Tecumseh Sherman.  They participated in the Battles of Resaca, Adairsville (Cassville), New Hope Church, and Kennesaw Mountain.

In July 1864, Utley resigned due to poor health and returned to Wisconsin.

Postbellum years

In public office, Utley was appointed Postmaster of Racine in 1869, and re-appointed in 1878.

Utley and his son, Hamilton, purchased the Racine Journal in 1865, which they published for nine years.  In 1874, the Utleys sold the Journal and started the Racine Times and the Utley Dollar Weekly.

In the 1870s, Utley became associated with the new Greenback Party, and, in 1878, he began publishing the New Deal, a Greenback paper. Utley was the Greenback Party's nominee for Governor of Wisconsin in the 1884 election.  Utley came in a distant fourth as Jeremiah McLain Rusk won re-election.

Utley's health never fully recovered from his time in captivity.  He died of diabetes at his home in Racine in 1887.

Personal life and family

Utley married his first wife, Louisa Wing, January 14, 1839, while living in New York.  They had three children together, but only their son, Hamilton, survived to adulthood.  Louisa died in 1864, a few months before Colonel Utley resigned from the Army.

Utley met his second wife after the war.  Sarah Wooster was the widow of Dr. Wooster, who had been a surgeon for the 15th Wisconsin Volunteer Regiment.  Sarah had one son from her previous marriage.  Utley married Sarah Wooster on February 22, 1866.  They had one son together, William L. Utley.

Socially, Colonel Utley was a Mason and a member of the Grand Army of the Republic.

Electoral history

U.S. House of Representatives (1882)

| colspan="6" style="text-align:center;background-color: #e9e9e9;"| General Election, November 7, 1882

Wisconsin Governor (1884)

| colspan="6" style="text-align:center;background-color: #e9e9e9;"| General Election, November 4, 1884

References

External links
 

1814 births
1887 deaths
19th-century American newspaper editors
American hoteliers
Editors of Wisconsin newspapers
People from Monson, Massachusetts
Politicians from Racine, Wisconsin
People of Wisconsin in the American Civil War
American portrait painters
Members of the Wisconsin State Assembly
Union Army colonels
Wisconsin Democrats
Wisconsin Free Soilers
19th-century American politicians
Wisconsin Greenbacks
Wisconsin Republicans
Wisconsin state senators
Painters from Wisconsin
American male journalists
19th-century American painters
19th-century male artists
19th-century American male writers
19th-century American businesspeople
Military personnel from Massachusetts